Joseph Allen Pearson (born September 19, 1991) is an American pop and R&B singer and actor from Hinesville, Georgia, lives in San Diego, California. Joey began performing at the age of nine.

Pearson was a semi-finalist on the renewed United States nationally syndicated talent show, Star Search, starring Arsenio Hall but has also appeared on a Christmas episode of Jenny Jones' talk show, performed at Universal Studios in Hollywood, The Del Mar Fair located in San Diego, and performed twice at the famed House of Blues in Hollywood, CA, among other venues.

He earned awards from Ed McMahon's Next Big Star internet contest, a KidsTalk Young Achievers Award and a Billy Gilman Billyheads Rising Star Award. Joey is an animal lover, animal right's activist and vegetarian.

Joey is represented by Josquin Des Pres, producer, songwriter, best-selling author and former Warner Chappell songwriter and co-writer with Bernie Taupin and is also represented by Scott Carlson, manager of the rock band Veruca Salt as well as Corey Haim and Corey Feldman, among others.

Joey categorizes himself as a pop/r&b/soul singer and musician and cites as his biggest influences, Stevie Wonder, Donny Hathaway, Otis Redding, Curtis Mayfield, Ray Charles, Aretha Franklin, and more currently, John Legend, and Elton John.

Joey continues to sing in and around the San Diego area in his local church and for the school where he is employed. He also frequently posts songs on his Facebook account, accompanying himself on the piano.

Discography

Albums
Something to Say, 2002
Novel, 2003
Authentic, 2006

EPs
Mirror Image, 2004

Television 
The Jenny Jones Show (2000)
Star Search (2002)

External links 
Myspace Channel
YouTube Channel
Track Star Studios

1991 births
Living people
American child singers
American male pop singers
American contemporary R&B singers
Participants in American reality television series
Musicians from San Diego
Place of birth missing (living people)
People from Hinesville, Georgia
Singers from Georgia (U.S. state)
21st-century American singers
21st-century American male singers